Woodcroft Halt railway station was a former railway halt located in the parish of Buriton between Rowlands Castle and Petersfield on the Portsmouth Direct Line.

History
During World War II, in 1940, the Admiralty requisitioned Ditcham Park, a nearby country house for use as a convalescent home for sailors (the house is now a private school). Woodcroft Halt, which was also known as Ditcham Park Halt, opened on 4 October 1943, and closed on 1 October 1945.

Because of its naval nature, it was featured on few maps, but some maps did mark it by a little tab without a name.

It was closed in 1945 and subsequently demolished; just a footbridge remains.

Location

Notes

References

External links
 Buritan Heritage Bank - Information Sheet No. 14 Ditcham
 BBC WW2 People's War - COMMISSONS [WAR] CANDIDATE, Ralph W. Hill, 05 August 2005
 Picture of Ditcham Park School at Geograph
 Ordnance Survey - New Popular Edition - Map

Disused railway stations in Hampshire
Former Southern Railway (UK) stations
Railway stations in Great Britain opened in 1943
Railway stations in Great Britain closed in 1945